Howard is a Capital MetroRail commuter rail station in Austin, Texas. It is located in Northwest Austin at the corner of Howard Lane and MoPac Expressway. Howard Station includes a Park & Ride with 200 spaces.


History

The station opened on March 22, 2010 as a side platform and one track. The design of the platform allowed a second track on the unused side of the platform to be easily built due to the presence of platform-edge tactile tiles and track ballast having been constructed with the original station. In 2018, the second track was built on the previously unused side of the platform to allow trains traveling in opposing directions to pass one another at the station, similar to the design of MLK Junior Station. This transformed the station into a two-track, island platform station.

Bus connections
 #50 Round Rock Howard Station
 #243 Wells Branch

References

External links
 Howard station overview
 Howard station from W. Howard Ln from Google Maps Street View

Capital MetroRail stations in Austin
Railway stations in the United States opened in 2010
Railway stations in Travis County, Texas